was a Japanese writer.

Born in Tsukiji, Tokyo, he graduated from Tokyo Imperial University. His major work is Kaichoon 海潮音 (The Sound of the Tide, 1905), a collection of translations from Western poets by Ueda himself.

References

External links 
 e-texts of Bin's works at Aozora bunko

1874 births
1916 deaths
Japanese writers